The 2011 term of the Supreme Court of the United States began October 3, 2011, and concluded September 30, 2012. The table illustrates which opinion was filed by each justice in each case and which justices joined each opinion.

Table key

2011 term opinions

2011 term membership and statistics
This was the seventh term of Chief Justice Roberts' tenure and the second term with the same membership.

Notes

References

 

Lists of United States Supreme Court opinions by term